Bird food plants are certain trees, shrubs and herbaceous plants bearing fruits which afford food for birds. These have been discovered by observation, and by the scientific examination of the contents of birds' stomachs. By planting those species, therefore, which have been proved most desirable and that are suited to the climate and soil of the chosen location, birds can be attracted to the vicinity of dwelling houses or to any other desired spot as a copse or shrubbery, or, on the other hand, lured away from valuable orchards, since they appear to like best arid, bitter, sour or aromatic fruits, distasteful to human beings, even better than the cultivated kinds.

Many of these bird-attracting plants are ornamental as well, since many have pretty fruits, red in color and often clinging to their branches far into the winter, furnishing grateful additions to the meager fare of hard-weather birds.

Plant genera

Trees
 figs (Ficus)
 wild olive (Olea)
 wild cherries (Prunus)
 nettle trees (Celtis)
 tree fuchsias (Halleria)
 dogwoods (Cornus)
 pepper tree (Schinus)
 pepperidge (Nyssa)
 persimmons or ebony trees (Diospyros)
 China tree (Melia)
 pines (Pinus)
 oaks (Quercus)
 magnolias (Magnolia)
 maples (Acer)
 manzanita (Arctostaphylos)
 cedars and junipers (Juniperus)
 hollies (Ilex)
 mountain ashes (Pyrus)
 hackberries (Celtis)
 sassafras (Sassafras)
 hawthorns (Crataegus)
 mulberries (Morus)
 palm trees (several genera including Phoenix, Raphia and others)

Shrubs
 bietou or boneseed (Chrysanthemoides)
 cotoneaster or firethorn (Cotoneaster)
 elders (Sambucus)
 serviceberries or juneberries (Amelanchier)
 wild roses (Rosa)
 spurges (Euphorbia)
 snowberries (Symphoricarpos)
 buckthorns or lotebushes (Ziziphus)
 sumachs (Rhus)
 karees (Searsia)
 spicebush (Benzoin)
 pokeberry (Phytolacca)
 raisin bushes or crossberries (Grewia)
 cornels Cornus)
 bearberry (Arctostaphylos)
 silverberry (Eleagnus)
 buffalo berry (Shepherdia)
 loquat (Eriobotrya)
 buckthorn (Rhamnus)
 bayberries (Myrica)
 alders or hollies (Ilex)
 viburnums (Viburnum)
 bluewood (Condalia)
 nockaway (Ehretia)
 barberry (Berberis)

Vines
 wild grapes (Vitis and related genera such as Rhoicissus)
 Virginia creeper (Parthenocissus quinquefolia)
 bittersweet (Celastrus)
 hog peanut (Amphicarpaea)
 milk pea (Galactia)

Birds

Sparrows
The many sparrows feed chiefly on weed seeds, but more acceptable plants from the gardener's point of view can be offered to them:
 so-called millets (Panicum, Setaria, Eleusine)
 princes' feather (Amaranthus, Polygonum)
 chamomiles, white and yellow (Anthemis)
 California poppy (Eschscholzia californica)
 tarweed (Madia)
 bachelor's buttons (Centaurea)

Ducks
Wild ducks are attracted by several aquatic and semi-aquatic plants, among the most important being:
 wild rice (Zizania)
 wild celery, or tape-grass (Vallisneria)
 pondweeds (Potamogeton)
 arrowheads, also called wapato and the Delta duck potato (Sagittaria)
 wild millet (Echinochloa)
 chufa tubers (Cyperus)

See also
 Nectar source
 Bird feeding

Notes

References
 This work in turn cites:
 Kennard, H., List of Trees, Shrubs, Vines and Herbaceous Plants, native to New England, bearing fruit or seeds attractive to Birds (Reprint from Bird-Lore, v. XIV, no. 4, 1912)
McAtee, W. L., Plants useful to attract Birds and protect Fruit, (Reprint from Yearbook of Agriculture 1898)
 Pamphlets, farmers' bulletins, circulars and reports published by the United States Department of Agriculture, and Bureau of Biological Survey.

 
Ethology
Symbiosis